Ervin L. Randle (born October 12, 1962) is a former American football linebacker. He played in the National Football League (NFL) from 1985 to 1992 for the Tampa Bay Buccaneers and Kansas City Chiefs. He attended Baylor University, where he played college football. He is the older brother of Hall of Famer John Randle.

Randle played a total of 105 games during his eight years in the NFL . On defense, he had a total of eight sacks and one interception. He also returned the ball one time in 1986 while playing for the Buccaneers. He played six seasons with the Buccaneers before being traded to the Chiefs for his last two years in the league. He was known for playing with intensity, to the extent that he was awarded the NFL "Hit Of The Year" Award in 1987.

After retiring from the NFL, Ervin worked as a car salesman. Currently he owns Classic Chevrolet in Lawton, Oklahoma.

His eldest son Cameron was killed while biking by a drunk driver on November 23, 2017.

References

External links
 

1962 births
Living people
American football linebackers
Baylor Bears football players
Kansas City Chiefs players
Tampa Bay Buccaneers players
People from Hearne, Texas
Players of American football from Texas
African-American players of American football
21st-century African-American people
20th-century African-American sportspeople